The 2016–17 Big Bash League season or BBL|06 was the sixth season of the KFC Big Bash League, the professional men's Twenty20 domestic cricket competition in Australia. The tournament ran from 20 December 2016 to 28 January 2017. The format of the tournament was identical to previous seasons. Each team played eight group stage matches, four at home and four away, before the top four ranked teams progressed to the Semi-finals.

The BBL title was won by the Perth Scorchers, who defeated the Sydney Sixers by nine wickets in the final to claim their third title. Chris Lynn of the Brisbane Heat was named player of the tournament for the second consecutive season, scoring 309 runs from just five matches. The leading run-scorer was Ben Dunk of the Adelaide Strikers, who scored 364 runs over the season. The leading wicket-taker was Sean Abbott of the Sixers, who took 20 wickets from ten matches. He was also named the best player under 25 in the tournament.

Pre-season

Points table

Group stage

Fixtures
There are 32 matches scheduled to be played during the group stage of the sixth edition of the Big Bash League.

Round 1

Round 2

Round 3

Round 4

Round 5

Round 6

Round 7

Round 8

Knockout phase

Semi-finals

Final

Statistics

Most runs

Source: ESPNcricinfo, 28 January 2017

Most wickets 

Source: ESPNcricinfo, 28 January 2017

Attendances

TV audience
BBL games are currently broadcast in Australia by the free-to-air Network Ten.

Following are the television ratings for 2016–17 BBL season in Australia.

The Super Over of the second semi final match drew ratings of 1,720,000 nationally, and 1,250,000 in the 5 metro cities.

References

Further reading

External links
Official fixtures
Series home at ESPN Cricinfo
 
 

Big Bash League seasons
Big Bash League
Big Bash League
2016–17 Big Bash League